Steven Michael Hilton (born November 9, 1950) is an American philanthropist. He is the son of hotel magnate Barron Hilton, and grandson of Conrad Hilton who founded the Hilton Hotels chain. Steven Hilton is the chairman of the Conrad N. Hilton Foundation, a humanitarian charity  working to improve the lives of disadvantaged and vulnerable people throughout the world. He served as president and CEO of the foundation prior to his retirement in 2015, since which he has remained chairman. During his tenure, annual grants have grown from a total of $6 million to $100 million a year, providing more than $1.4 billion to nonprofit organizations.

Early career and education
Hilton was born in Santa Monica, California, the third of eight children born to Marilyn June (née Hawley) and  William Barron Hilton.  Barron, who succeeded his father Conrad Hilton as president and CEO of Hilton Hotels Corporation in 1966, served as the family's patriarch after Conrad's death in 1979.  Steven grew up with his siblings at their family home, first in Santa Monica, and later in the Holmby Hills section of Los Angeles.

He earned a bachelor's degree in History at the University of California, Santa Barbara in 1974, and prepared to follow his father into the hotel business.  He spent five years working in a variety of sales and operations positions at Hilton hotels in Georgia, Alabama and California.  He briefly explored the science and economics of aquaculture in California and Hawaii before returning to Southern California in 1983 to contemplate his next career move.  He sought the counsel of Donald H. Hubbs, a longtime business advisor to both his father and his grandfather. Hubbs, who was chairman, president and chief executive officer of the Conrad N. Hilton Foundation, felt that Hilton's work ethic and sensitivity were well-suited to philanthropy.  He offered him a job as an entry-level program assistant.

Conrad N. Hilton Foundation
Hilton was soon promoted to program associate, then program officer.  In the late '80s, he earned a master's degree from the Anderson School of Management at the University of California, Los Angeles.  In 1989, he was put in charge of grant-making as vice president of programs, and was elected to the board of directors.  The board named him president in 1998, and on Hubbs' retirement in 2005, Hilton succeeded him as CEO as well.

During his years with the foundation, Hilton has honed the foundation's focus onto 11 priority areas: providing safe water, ending chronic homelessness, preventing substance abuse, helping children affected by HIV and AIDS, supporting transition-age youth in foster care, preventing avoidable blindness, disaster relief and recovery, hospitality workforce development, improving the lives of multiple sclerosis patients, supporting Catholic education, and extending Conrad Hilton’s support for the work of Catholic Sisters.  The foundation also introduced the annual Conrad N. Hilton Humanitarian Prize, which is awarded to a nonprofit organization doing extraordinary work to reduce human suffering.  The prize shines a spotlight on the charity that helps raise awareness and funding for its good work, thereby leveraging the effectiveness of an unrestricted $2 million grant which is awarded along with the prize.

Hilton’s leadership was instrumental in many of the foundation's milestone achievements:

Establishing the Conrad N. Hilton Fund for Sisters, which has since distributed more than $84 million and enabled Sisters to serve the poor in more than 140 countries
Providing access to safe water for 2 million people in Sub-Saharan Africa
Building capacity for improved services and educational opportunities for blind and multi-handicapped children throughout the U.S. and in more than 60 countries
Pioneering a research-based substance abuse curriculum currently used in one quarter of the nation's school districts
Championing permanent supportive housing as a highly effective solution to chronic homelessness
Mobilizing a community collaborative partnership to address hunger in Southern Nevada
Conceiving of and supporting the development of a comprehensive public policy framework for family violence that became the seminal document on the subject

Hilton has also been directly involved in the foundation's response to humanitarian crises. He traveled to Haiti in January 2010, just days after the earthquake that killed 220,000 people and injured 330,000 more.  The Hilton Foundation immediately provided $500,000 in grants to organizations that provided emergency aid for more than 200,000 survivors.  Hilton accompanied aid workers to the devastated capital of Port-au-Prince, and the epicenter in the area of Léogâne 16 miles to the west.  Later in the year, the Hilton Foundation provided another $575,000 in grants to three organizations that were helping children severely traumatized by the quake.

Since 2012, the Hilton Foundation has funded relief efforts for the Syrian refugee crisis—the largest population displacement since World War II.  In February 2015, Hilton traveled to the Turkish-Syrian border with two of these grantee organizations – Luftfahrt ohne Grenzen (LOG/Wings of Help) and International Medical Corps – to see first-hand the services being provided in partnership with the Turkish Government, the U.N. High Commissioner for Refugees, and other international organizations and local nongovernmental organizations.  By March 2015, the foundation had made a total of $1.8 million in grants to organizations serving this displaced population.  Hilton authored an op-ed piece published in The Seattle Times calling for increased investment in refugee relief by the international community—with a special call for increased support from foundations.  He warned that it could become one of the greatest humanitarian disasters of our lifetime.  His words were prophetic.  Just a year later, more than 13.5 million Syrians were in need of humanitarian aid, with 6.5 million displaced from their homes inside the country. An estimated 4.8 million Syrians had flooded across the border seeking refuge in Europe and the Middle East.

Hilton also took a personal interest in the effort to relocate the foundation from an office building in Los Angeles to a permanent campus in Agoura Hills 40 miles to the northwest.

By 2016, the assets of the foundation had grown to more than $2.5 billion.  Like his father before him, Barron Hilton has pledged 97 percent of his personal wealth to the foundation as well.  His endowment could bring the total corpus to more than $5 billion, making it one of the dozen or so largest foundations in the U.S.  Barron, who had been a director of the foundation since 1950, served as chairman of the board from 2007 to 2012 before retiring and ceding the position to his son.  At the end of 2015, Steven Hilton retired as president and CEO, while retaining his position as chairman of the board.  Prior Steven's arrival in 1983, the Conrad N. Hilton Foundation had made a total of $6 million in grants since its formation in 1944.  By the time he retired, the foundation had made $1.4 billion in grants.

Honors
Over his 30 years with the foundation, Steven Hilton has received an Honorary Doctor of Humane Letters degree from Pepperdine University, and has been honored by St. Joseph Center and the National Multiple Sclerosis Society through its Southern California Chapter.  He was selected as one of UCLA Anderson’s 100 Inspirational Alumni and was given the Distinguished Alumni Award by the UC Santa Barbara Alumni Association.  Hilton was the inaugural recipient of the Yunus Social Innovation Medal presented by Nobel Laureate Muhammad Yunus and California State University, Channel Islands.  He was also the inaugural recipient of Southern California Grantmakers’ Heart of Philanthropy Award.  He previously served on the board of the Conrad N. Hilton Fund for Sisters. He also served on the boards of the Archdiocesan Finance Council, the BEST Foundation, Loyola Marymount University, Southern California Grantmakers, and St. Joseph Center.

Personal
Hilton resides in Malibu, California, where he enjoys his lifelong passion of surfing. He earned a 2nd degree black belt in Aikido and has been practicing Taiji Chuan for a number of years.  Personal hobbies include the study of health and wellness, hiking, weight-training, yoga, gardening and reading.

References

1950 births
Conrad Hilton family
Living people
University of California, Santa Barbara alumni
UCLA Anderson School of Management alumni
People from Malibu, California
People from Holmby Hills, Los Angeles
People from Santa Monica, California